Ruslan Gataullin (born 1 December 1979) is a Russian long jumper. His personal best jump is 8.29 metres, achieved in May 2007 in Sochi.  Early in his career he was also a pole vaulter achieving a personal best vault of 5.60m before focusing solely on the long jump.

He finished seventh at the 2006 European Athletics Championships and at the 2006 IAAF World Cup. He also competed at the 2006 World Indoor Championships and the 2007 World Championships without reaching the final.

An ethnic Tatar from Tashkent, Uzbekistan, he is the younger brother of pole vaulter Rodion Gataullin.

International competitions

References

1979 births
Living people
Sportspeople from Tashkent
Russian male long jumpers
World Athletics Championships athletes for Russia
Russian Athletics Championships winners
Uzbekistani people of Tatar descent
Russian people of Uzbekistani descent
Tatar sportspeople